The golden-fronted fulvetta (Schoeniparus variegaticeps), also known as the gold-fronted fulvetta, is a species of bird in the family Pellorneidae.  It is endemic to China.  Its natural habitat is subtropical or tropical moist montane forest.  It is threatened by habitat loss.

References

Collar, N. J. & Robson, C. 2007. Family Timaliidae (Babblers)  pp. 70 – 291 in; del Hoyo, J., Elliott, A. & Christie, D.A. eds. Handbook of the Birds of the World, Vol. 12. Picathartes to Tits and Chickadees. Lynx Edicions, Barcelona.

golden-fronted fulvetta
Birds of South China
Endemic birds of China
golden-fronted fulvetta
Taxonomy articles created by Polbot